George Henry Jordan Bennett (22 September 1911 – 10 October 1974) was an Australian rules footballer who played with Footscray and Hawthorn in the VFL.

Bennett commenced his VFA career in 1929 with Camberwell.

Bennett started his VFL career in 1930 with Hawthorn and remained with the club until the end of the 1933 season. The club was enforcing a rule in which a player who missed three consecutive senior games due to either injury or suspension had to return to the side through the reserves.

Bennett disagreed with this rule and moved to Footscray for the 1934 season. The following season he won their best and fairest award as well as finishing 8th in the 1935 Brownlow Medal.

Bennett played with Camberwell in 1941. He ended up playing 26 games for Camberwell.

He came back to the Hawks in 1942 and brought up his 200th league game in 1944.

Bennett was appointed as captain / coach of Sandringham in 1945 and played 22 games with Sandringham in 1945 and 1946.

He will be remembered for being a defender, famed for skyscraping marks and skill in the air.

Bennett played for Matong Football Club in the South West Football League (New South Wales) in 1950.

References

External links

1911 births
1974 deaths
Australian rules footballers from Melbourne
Western Bulldogs players
Hawthorn Football Club players
Camberwell Football Club players
Sandringham Football Club coaches
Charles Sutton Medal winners
People from Hawthorn, Victoria